The Interoceanic Highway or Trans-oceanic highway is an international, transcontinental highway in Peru and Brazil to connect the two countries.  The east–west passageway spans 2600 kilometers. From Peru's Pacific Ocean coastline, it continues across the Andes mountains and through a large part of the Amazon rainforest in the Peruvian department of Madre de Dios. It then travels into Northwestern Brazil where it connects with a network of existing highways to the Atlantic. Thus, passing by the regionally important cities of Cusco, Cobija and Rio Branco. It entailed the renovation and construction of roughly 2,600 kilometers of roads and 22 bridges. Completed in 2011, it creates a connected highway from the Peruvian ports of San Juan de Marcona to the Brazilian city of Rio Branco its ZPE (Special Export Zone) and the rest of the country. The project came into being via a 2004 agreement between Alejandro Toledo and Luiz Inácio Lula da Silva, then presidents of the two countries.

In Peru the project is known by the MTC (Ministerio de Transportes y Comunicaciones) as the Corredor Vial Interoceánico Sur Perú-Brasil and by ProInversion (Private Investment Promotion Agency - Peru) as the Initiative for the Integration of the Regional Infrastructure of South America, (Iniciativa para la Integración de la Infraestructura Regional Suramericana) (IIRSA), SUR axis. The project is part of a national road investment plan which involves the construction of three longitudinal highways, and 20 transversal highways. Parts of these transversal highways make up part of IIRSA SUR.

Construction
As the project now links three Peruvian ports to Brazil, the route has several branches (map). Furthermore, the construction of the various branches has been divided up into a number of stretches or sections, each of which has been constructed as part of a separate concession. Five concessions were constructed in two blocks:
block of concessions awarded in 2005:
2: Urcos (near Cusco) - Inambari, Inambari District (in the Amazon Basin, near Puerto Maldonado); 300 km of previously unpaved roads
3: Inambari - Iñapari, Iñapari District (on the Brazilian Border, opposite the Brazilian town of Assis Brasil); 403 km of previously unpaved roads
4: Azangaro - Inambari; 306 km of previously unpaved roads
block of concessions awarded in 2007:
1: San Juan de Marcona (Pacific Ocean) - Nazca - Abancay - Cusco – Urcos; 763 km of previously paved roads
5: branch 1 Matarani (Pacific Ocean) - Arequipa - Juliaca (near Lake Titicaca) - Azangaro; and branch 2 Ilo (Pacific Ocean) - Moquegua - Humajalso - Puente Gallatini - Puno - Juliaca; 752 km of previously paved roads and 62 km of previously unpaved roads

In June 2005, the second, third, and fourth sections were leased to specialized Peruvian and Brazilian consortia of private companies for 25 years, in which they will be responsible for looking after the highway, the built and forthcoming bridges, and tollbooths. The first and the last section were leased in 2007.

The Brazilian section runs from the tri-border town of Assis Brasil to the intersection with the main Brazilian road network in Rio Branco, via the BR-317, in this case, the road  leading to the Atlantic, being the BR-364, connecting São Paulo to elsewhere.

The total project has an estimated cost of US$1.3 billion, but some analysts predict a higher cost. Of this, about US$810 million is for stretches 2 - 4, $199 million is for stretches 1 and 5, and the remainder for bridges, urban connections, and overhead.

The project employed about 6,000 people during construction. It was inaugurated by Peruvian President Garcia in August 2011 and is now officially complete and operational.

Andean watershed crossings
Two branches of the Interoceanic Highway cross the main Andean watershed. The Urcos - Inambari branch crosses the watershed approximately here, about 7 km (in a straight line) north-east of Urcos (the road distance is much longer). The Azangaro - Inambari branch crosses the watershed approximately here, about 85 km north of Azangaro.

Practical results

In 2017, it was found that the highway was practically not being used to trade. The average circulation was only seven commercial vehicles per hour, an extremely low average. According to the Peruvian authorities, there were basically no Brazilian products on the way to the ports in Peru.

In 2020, official figures showed that, of the US$246 million exported or imported by Acre between 2009 and 2019, just over 18% were made by the road (about US$44.6 million was the value of the goods transacted by highway).

This was largely because Acre had no direct road connection with the rest of Brazil. Although the BR-364 exists, there was no road bridge over the Madeira River, between the cities of Rio Branco and Porto Velho, Rondônia; the crossing of vehicles was made by ferries, which have low capacity and are expensive. However, the Abunã bridge was built and completed in 2021; As a result, Acre came out of road isolation and will develop in the coming years.

Other Trans-Andean transport projects 
There is an intention to build another route between Paita and Yurimaguas, both in Peru, to give river access to the Amazon and Brazil.

Bibliography 
 
 
  (search for 'Corredor Vial Interoceánico')

References 

Highways in Brazil
Roads in Peru
Union of South American Nations
Highways in São Paulo (state)